Statistics of Emperor's Cup in the 1988 season.

Overview
It was contested by 32 teams, and Nissan Motors won the championship.

Results

1st round
Yamaha Motors 3–0 Toho Titanium
Fujitsu 1–2 Matsushita Electric
Cosmo Oil 2–1 Toshiba
Aoyama Gakuin University 0–8 Honda
Yomiuri 4–1 TDK
Komazawa University 2–1 YKK
Yanmar Diesel 8–1 Sapporo University
Tsukuba University 0–2 Nissan Motors
Mitsubishi Motors 1–0 Mazda
Doshisha University 1–2 Sumitomo Metals
Osaka University of Commerce 3–4 Yawata Steel
Mitsubishi Chemical Kurosaki 1–5 Fujita Industries
Furukawa Electric 1–0 Chuo Bohan
Tanabe Pharmaceuticals 4–1 Teijin
All Nippon Airways 5–0 Osaka University of Health and Sport Sciences
Toyota Motors 1–0 NKK

2nd round
Yamaha Motors 2–0 Matsushita Electric
Cosmo Oil 0–2 Honda
Yomiuri 3–0 Komazawa University
Yanmar Diesel 0–1 Nissan Motors
Mitsubishi Motors 1–2 Sumitomo Metals
Yawata Steel 0–7 Fujita Industries
Furukawa Electric 1–1 (PK 2–4) Tanabe Pharmaceuticals
All Nippon Airways 3–1 Toyota Motors

Quarterfinals
Yamaha Motors 2–0 Honda
Yomiuri 1–1 (PK 2–3) Nissan Motors
Sumitomo Metals 0–2 Fujita Industries
Tanabe Pharmaceuticals 0–1 All Nippon Airways

Semifinals
Yamaha Motors 0–1 Nissan Motors
Fujita Industries 2–1 All Nippon Airways

Final

Nissan Motors 3–1 Fujita Industries
Nissan Motors won the championship Excluded from the Asian Cup Winners' Cup 1989.

References
 NHK

Emperor's Cup
Emperor's Cup
1989 in Japanese football